Allah-o Akbar Rural District is a rural district (dehestan) in the Central District of Dasht-e Azadegan County, Khuzestan Province, Iran. At the 2006 census, its population was 12,639, in 2,093 families.  The rural district has 21 villages.

References 

Rural Districts of Khuzestan Province
Dasht-e Azadegan County